Aras Iskanderovich Agalarov (born 8 November 1955) is an Azerbaijani-Russian billionaire real estate developer. Several sources have described him as a Russian oligarch.

Early life
Born in Baku, Agalarov was educated at the Azerbaijan Polytechnical Institute. There, he studied computer engineering and was a member of the Communist Party of Azerbaijan and Baku City Committee.

Career
Agalarov then opened the first Crocus Inter store, which became a retail business that includes malls offering housewares. This moved him into property development, where he built the Crocus City Mall, the largest shopping centre in Moscow. Adjacent to this he then built the largest trade center in Russia on the outskirts of Moscow, Crocus Expo, and has since developed a luxury housing development.  He has partnered with Robert De Niro in Nobu Matsuhisa's two Moscow restaurants.

In 2012, the  built a new campus for the Far Eastern Federal University outside Vladivostok. Agalarov says he had to buy a larger Gulfstream jet to visit the site, where he spent $100 million of his own money on cost overruns on the $1.2 billion campus of 70 new building on Russky Island overlooking the Pacific Ocean. He then won projects for a Moscow superhighway and two stadiums for the 2018 FIFA World Cup.

In January 2013, Agalarov and his son visited Las Vegas, Nevada, after Donald Trump, the beauty pageant's owner, announced at Miss Universe 2012 that the next competition would be hosted by Agalarov in Moscow. He paid Trump $20 million to host the pageant. In November 2013, President Vladimir Putin awarded Agalarov the Russian Order of Honor. That month, Agalarov hosted Miss Universe 2013 at his Crocus City Hall. Moreover, Agalarov's wife acted as a judge on the panel while his son was one of the performers.

Herman Gref, who runs Sberbank of Russia, Agalarov and his son hosted a dinner for Trump on the night of the pageant. While in Moscow, Phil Ruffin, who is a partner in Trump International Hotel Las Vegas, and Trump met with the Agalarov and his son at the Ritz-Carlton. Trump then appeared in a music video with Agalarov's son alongside many of the contestants. Trump and Agalarov planned on a $3 billion project, with state-owned Sberbank agreeing to provide 70% of the financing.

Agalarov has served as a liaison between Trump and Putin. According to an interview, they once discussed the construction of a Trump Tower in Russia. Agalarov had also reportedly tried to set up a meeting between the two, but this was canceled due to Putin having to meet the Dutch royal couple at the time. Putin instead sent Trump a fedoskino miniature.

In 2014, Kyrgyzstan signed a treaty with Russia that named Crocus Group as the single supplier of services to integrate into the Eurasian Economic Union, avoiding competitive bidding on the $127 million deal.

Agalarov's son, Emin, helped arrange Russian lawyer Natalia Veselnitskaya's June 9, 2016 meeting with Donald Trump Jr., Jared Kushner, and Paul Manafort in Trump Tower. Following the meeting, Agalarov wired $1.2 million to a bank in New Jersey controlled by Emin, a transfer which is being investigated by American law enforcement.

Emin said that after Trump won the United States presidential election in 2016, Trump sent them a handwritten note, saying he does not forget his friends.

As of June 2017, he had an estimated net worth of US$1.91 billion, most of which is derived from his real estate ventures. In January 2017, Forbes listed him as the 51st richest Russian.

Personal life
Agalarov is married and has two children. His son Emin Agalarov is a businessman and singer-songwriter. Emin was married to Leyla Aliyeva, the daughter of the current President of Azerbaijan, Ilham Aliyev, until they divorced in May 2015. Agalarov has twin grandsons from his son's marriage. In July 2017, Agalarov put his mansion in Alpine, New Jersey up for sale for $7 million. The mansion eventually sold in November 2017 for $5.8 million.

References

External links

Profile at Forbes magazine

1955 births
Living people
Businesspeople from Baku
Azerbaijani billionaires
Russian businesspeople in real estate
Russian billionaires
Azerbaijani emigrants to Russia
Azerbaijani investors
Azerbaijan Technical University alumni
Russians associated with interference in the 2016 United States elections
Agalarov family